The small-billed tinamou (Crypturellus parvirostris) is a type of Tinamou commonly found in dry savanna in  Amazonian South America.

Description
Its upperparts are dark brown, with grey to brownish under parts and head. Its bill and legs are red.

Taxonomy
The small-billed tinamou is a monotypic species. All tinamou are from the family Tinamidae, and in the larger scheme are also ratites. Unlike other ratites, tinamous can fly, although in general, they are not strong fliers. All ratites evolved from prehistoric flying birds, and tinamous are the closest living relative of these birds.

Etymology
Crypturellus is formed from three Latin or Greek words.  kruptos meaning covered or hidden, oura meaning tail, and ellus meaning diminutive.  Therefore, Crypturellus means small hidden tail.

Behavior
Like other tinamous, the small-billed eats fruit off the ground or low-lying bushes. They also eat small amounts of invertebrates, flower buds, tender leaves, seeds, and roots. The male incubates the eggs which may come from as many as 4 different females, and then will raise them until they are ready to be on their own, usually 2–3 weeks. The nest is located on the ground in dense brush or between raised root buttresses.

Domestication
The small billed tinamou has been considered an ideal candidate for domestication as the birds can raise 3-4 broods per year and are resistant to diseases that affect chickens

Range and habitat
The small-billed tinamou prefers dry savanna, but will also reside in lowland shrubland. Its range is Amazonian South America; Brazil except for the southeastern portion, northeastern Peru, eastern Bolivia, Paraguay, and northeastern Argentina.

Conservation

Footnotes

References

External links
 Associação Mãe-da-lua Small-billed Tinamou (Crypturellus parvirostris) - photos, sounds, notes

small-billed tinamou
small-billed tinamou
Birds of Brazil
Birds of Bolivia
Birds of Paraguay
small-billed tinamou